Ashdod Sand Dune is a psammosere ecosystem close to the city of Ashdod on the Israeli Coastal Plain near the Mediterranean sea. It is south of Tel Aviv.

Background

Over the last few decades the dunes have been replaced with cities, industrial areas, and power plants, and the dune landscape has gradually disappeared. Thus, one of the most characteristic and important aspects of the Israeli landscape is rapidly vanishing.

The largest remnant of Israel's coastal sand dunes is between Ashdod and Ashkelon. This is the only part of the landscape that still retains its shifting sands with its attendant animal and plant life and marks of bygone civilizations.

The importance of the area derives from its natural and cultural qualities. The dunes contain ecological systems of scientific value. Their function as an open area separating the urban sectors that are rapidly covering the country is of great significance, as is its role as a natural public recreation.

Proposed Sand Dune Park 

Because of the importance and uniqueness of this area and its potential for study, hiking, and recreation, the Society for the Protection of Nature in Israel (SPNI) has initiated the drive for a Sand Dune Park that would serve to protect the dunes and their properties for research, education, nature hikes, and public use.

The dune park extends over 11 square kilometers between the Mediterranean Sea to the west and agricultural areas to the east, and between the city of Ashdod to the north and the Avtach water way to the south.

The area of the proposed park falls within three municipal jurisdictions: the northern part belongs to the city of Ashdod, the central part belongs to the Be'er Tuvia Regional Council, and the southern part belongs to the Hof Ashkelon Regional Council. Each of the municipal authorities had plans for developing the area which threatened to cover the dunes with buildings and roads. Additional factors threatening preservation of the dunes are the Ministry of tourism, which planned to build a "riviera" of hotels along the coast; the Israel Lands Authority, which is interested in mining the sand; the Israel Defense Forces, which wanted to use the area for manoeuvres; and others. Until 1982, the area was designated for a nuclear power plant. The plant was not built, but it resulted in stopping development, which saved the sands. When the plan for the power plant was canceled, interested parties pressured for development, but the SPNI then identified its importance and uniqueness and began to fight for its preservation.

In order stir public awareness and appreciation of the dunes, the SPNI established the Shiqmim Field School in Nitzanim in 1983. The school is housed in an historic building that once served the original settlers of Nitzanim. The SPNI also initiated a survey that identified and mapped the area's nature and landscape features; on the basis of this survey, the SPNI in co-operation with the Jewish National Fund (JNF) drew up a conceptual plan for the Sand Dune Park.

In 2021 the idea of turning the area into a nature reserve was rejected by the Ashdod Municipality and a plan for construction of about 6,600 housing units was approved.

References

Sand Dune
Dunes of Israel
Protected areas of Central District (Israel)